Self-propelled mortars are mechanized self-propelled artillery pieces that carry heavy mortars.

List

References

Citations

Bibliography

News sources 

 

Mortar carriers
Self-propelled mortar